The 2017 Wake Forest Demon Deacons baseball team represented Wake Forest University during the 2017 NCAA Division I baseball season. The Demon Deacons play their home games at Gene Hooks Field at Wake Forest Baseball Park as a member of the Atlantic Coast Conference. They were led by head coach Tom Walter in his 8th season at Wake Forest.

After a successful regular season record and conference record in ACC play the Demon Deacons secured a spot in the NCAA Tournament as the eighth overall seed. Wake Forest advanced to the Super Regionals, unfortunately the Deacs would lose to the Florida Gators in Game 2 of the Gainesville Super Regional. Eight players from the team were selected in the 2017 MLB Draft, setting a school record.

References

Wake Forest
Wake Forest Demon Deacons baseball seasons
Wake Forest baseball
Wake Forest